Opus vittatum ("banded work"), also called opus listatum, was an ancient Roman construction technique introduced at the beginning of the fourth century, made by parallel horizontal courses of tuff blocks alternated with bricks. 

This technique was adopted during the whole 4th century, and is typical of the works of Maxentius and Constantine.

See also

References

Sources

Roman construction techniques